Blue Collar Comedy Tour: The Movie is a 2003 American stand-up comedy concert film from Warner Bros. Pictures. It stars comedians Jeff Foxworthy and Bill Engvall and fellow Blue Collar comics Ron White and Larry the Cable Guy. The movie is similar in nature to that of The Original Kings of Comedy. It was followed by two direct-to-video sequels, Blue Collar Comedy Tour Rides Again (2004) and Blue Collar Comedy Tour: One for the Road (2006). The film received critical acclaim.

Premise 
The film features live stand-up performances filmed at the Dodge Theater in Phoenix, Arizona on July 21, 2002. It also features behind-the-scenes segments highlighting the individual comedians.

Television broadcast

When aired on Comedy Central, in addition to editing of the stand-up material for time and content, Heidi Klum's appearance is completely cut out.

Filming locations 

 Dodge Theater in Phoenix, Arizona
 Scottsdale, Arizona
 Scottsdale Fashion Square -7014 East Camelback Road (mall scenes)
 Phoenix, Arizona PARK N' SWAP
 Mesa, Arizona FIESTA MALL

Soundtrack 
 "Don't Ask Me No Questions", Chris Cagle
 "Act Naturally", Buck Owens
 "Sharp Dressed Man", ZZ Top
 "Boogie Chillen", John Lee Hooker
 "Venom Wearing Denim", Junior Brown

Reception
The film has received near-universal critical acclaim, praising the irreverent jokes and humor. On Rotten Tomatoes, the film has a 92% positive score.

References

External links 
 

Stand-up comedy concert films
Warner Bros. films
2003 films
2003 comedy films
Country music films
American comedy films
2000s English-language films
2000s American films